Lúčky is a village and municipality in the Žiar nad Hronom District of the Banská Bystrica Region of central Slovakia. The town belonged to a German language island. The German population was expelled in 1945.

Villages and municipalities in Žiar nad Hronom District